Pure verbs, or vocalic verbs, are those verbs of the Greek language that have their word stem ending in a vowel (monophthong of diphthong).

Origins
The Greek pure verbs can be assigned to several derivational types in the preceding Proto-Indo-European language:

Most of the verbs in -αω are derived from nominal ā-stems by forming the present tense with the suffix -i̯e-/-i̯o-: νικάω < *νῑκᾱ-i̯o- ‘to win, prevail’, from νίκα ‘victory’; τιμάω < *τῑμᾱ-i̯o- ‘to honor, revere’, from τιμά ‘honor’. A few verbs of this class underived verbs, e. g. δράω ‘to do’, σπάω ‘to draw, pull’.

Verbs in -εω are derived from a range of nominal stems: φιλέω < *φιλε-i̯o- ‘to love’, from φίλος ‘dear, beloved’; τελέω < *τελεσ-i̯o- ‘to finish’, from τέλος ‘target, destination’; φωνέω < *φωνε-i̯o- ‘to make a sound’, from φονή ‘sound’; μαρτυρέω < *μαρτυρε-i̯o- ‘to testify’, from μάρτυς‚ witness’. Examples for underived verbs in this class are: ῥέω < *ῥεϝω ‘to flow’, ζέω < *ζεσω ‘to boil’.

The verbs in -οω are mainly factitives derived from nominal o-stems: δηλόω ‘to clarify, reveal’, from δῆλος ‘clear, obvious’, δουλόω ‘to enslave, conquer’, from δοῦλος ‘servant, slave’.

The verbs in -ιω are derived from nominal i-stems: μηνίω ‘to be angry’, from μῆνις ‘anger, wrath’.

Among the verbs in -υω, there are underived ones, e. g. φύω ‘to produce, issue’, as well as some denominal verbs derived from u-stems, e. g. μεθύω ‘to be drunk’, from μέθυ ‘wine’.

The verbs in -ευω are derived from nominal consonant stems: παιδεύω ‘to educate’, from παῖς ‘child’, δουλεύω ‘to serve, to be a slave’, from δοῦλος ‘servant, slave’.

The verbs in -αιω are derived with the -i̯e-/-i̯o-suffix from roots ending in u̯: καίω < *καϝ-i̯o- ‘to burn’; κλαίω < *κλαϝ-i̯o- ‘to weep, wail’.

Conjugation
The following tables show the conjugated forms of the pure verb λῡ́ειν ‘to solve; to free; to destroy’ in classical Attic Greek.

Contract verbs
In the present and imperfect tenses, the sounds represented by α and ο, in Attic Greek also ε, are usually merged with the following thematic vowel: τιμάω > τιμῶ ‘I revere’, καλέω > καλῶ ‘I call’. In the Aeolic and Arcadocypriot dialects these verbs join the athematic class: κάλημμι ‘I call’.

Contract future tense forms
Some verbs in Attic Greek, among them all Verbs in -ίζω, have contracted future tense forms, that look the same as the present forms of verbs in -εω:

Literature
Carl Darling Buck, Comparative Grammar of Greek and Latin, Chicago/London 1933, p. 262 ff.
Carl Darling Buck, The Greek Dialects, Chicago 1955, p. 122 ff.
Jean Louis Burnouf, Méthode pour étudier la langue grecque, Paris 1835, p. 62 ff.
Raphael Kühner/Friedrich Blass, Ausführliche Grammatik der griechischen Sprache. Erster Teil: Elementar- und Formenlehre II, 3rd revised edition, Hannover 1892, pp. 98 ff., 122 ff., 198 ff.

Indo-European verbs
Greek grammar
Ancient Greek